Events from the year 1994 in Venezuela

Incumbents  
 President: Ramón José Velásquez (until 2 February), Rafael Caldera (starting 2 February)

Governors 
 Amazonas: Edgar Sayago Murillo 
 Anzoátegui: Ovidio González then Dennis Balza Ron
 Apure: Marcelo Oquendo Rojo
 Aragua: Carlos Tablante 
 Barinas: Gehard Cartay 
 Bolívar: Andrés Velásquez
 Carabobo: Henrique Salas Römer  
 Cojedes: José Felipe Machado 
 Delta Amacuro: Emeri Mata Millán then Armando Salazar
 Falcón: Aldo Cermeño 
 Guárico: José A. Malavé Risso
 Lara: José Mariano Navarro 
 Mérida: Jesús Rondón Nucete 
 Miranda: Arnaldo Arocha 
 Monagas: Guillermo Call
 Nueva Esparta: Morel Rodríguez Ávila 
 Portuguesa: Elias D'Onghia Colaprico 
 Sucre: Ramón Martínez 
 Táchira: José Francisco Ron Sandoval 
 Trujillo: José Méndez Quijada
 Yaracuy: Nelsón Suárez Montiel
 Zulia: Lolita Aniyar de Castro

Establishments 

 Construction of the Basilica of Christ of José was completed.

Births 

 Adrian Solano (cross-country skier) in Maracay
 Renzo Zambrano in Aragua de Maturín
 Anthony Blondell in Cumaná
 Ángel González (Venezuelan footballer)
 Nediam Vargas
 José Contreras Verna in Guasdualito
 Manuel Arteaga in Maracaibo
 Robert Páez in Cumaná

Deaths 

 Fulgencio Aquino in Caracas
 Elsa Gramcko in Caracas
 Dalmiro Finol in Maracaibo
 Ida Gramcko in Caracas
 Gego in Caracas
 César Tovar in Caracas

References